AFLA is an acronym for the following:

 Austronesian Formal Linguistics Association, administered from the University of Western Ontario
 Amateur Fencers League of America, predecessor to the now USFA/USA Fencing
 Adolescent Family Life Act, United States federal law